During the 2004–05 season Cardiff City played in the Football League Championship. It was the team's second year in the Championship since being promoted from League One. The season was also the last that manager Lennie Lawrence spent at the club before being replaced by Dave Jones at the end of the season.

Team kit and sponsorship
Cardiff's kits continued to be designed by Puma. Their main shirt sponsor continues as Welsh housing company Redrow homes.

Squad

|}

Transfers

Summer transfers in

Summer transfers out
*Indicates the player joined after being released by Cardiff

Loans in

January transfer window ins

January transfer window outs

Standings

Results by round

Fixtures and results

Championship

League Cup

FA Cup

FAW Premier Cup

See also
List of Cardiff City F.C. seasons
2004–05 in English football

References

2004-05
Welsh football clubs 2004–05 season
2004–05 Football League Championship by team